Psunj is a mountain in the southwestern Slavonia region in eastern Croatia. It is the highest mountain of Slavonia, with the highest peak of Brezovo polje at 984 m.a.s.l. In the north it extends to Ravna gora and Papuk, while otherwise it is surrounded by lowlands. It is located north of Nova Gradiška and southeast of Pakrac.

On Psunj, there is a 128.5 metres tall lattice tower used for FM- and TV-transmission, which was designed by Prof. Marjan Ivancic and built by Mostogradnja in 1962/1963.
Originally this tower was completely free-standing. Today it is additionally guyed at its upper section.

Psunj was called "Pisunus" in antiquity. There are several suggested etymologies for that. One is that it comes from the Indo-European root * (cattle). The other is that it comes from the Indo-European roots *peiH (big, in the sense "mountain") and *sen (old). One very similar to that is that it comes from *peiH and *sewn (black). The other is that it's related to the Latin word "pinus", meaning "pine tree" or "resin", itself without a widely accepted etymology.

References

Mountains of Croatia
Slavonia
Landforms of Požega-Slavonia County
Pannonian island mountains
Tourist attractions in Požega-Slavonia County